Haydée is an opéra comique by Daniel Auber.

Haydée may also refer to:
 Haydée, an opera by Felicita Casella
 Haidee, a character associated with the legendary lover Don Juan
 Haidée, a major figure in Byron's poem  Don Juan
 Haydée, a character from  The Count of Monte Cristo
 Haydée, a character in La Collectionneuse

People with the given name 
 Haydée Tamara Bunke Bider (1937–1967), better known as Tania or Tania the Guerrilla, communist revolutionary and spy in Cuba and Bolivia
 Haydée Coloso-Espino (1937–2021), Filipino swimmer
 Haidee Granger, television producer, writer, executive, and media consultant
 Haydée Santamaría (1923–1980), Cuban revolutionary
 Haydée Mercedes Sosa (1935–2009), known as La Negra, Argentine singer
 Haidee Tiffen (born 1979), New Zealand former cricketer
 Haydee Yorac (1941–2005), Filipino public servant, law professor and politician
 Haydée Verane Pinto Pereira da Silva Araújo (born 1985), Angolan/Portuguese sociologist

People with the surname 
 Marcia Haydée (born 1937), prima ballerina and ballet director

See also
 Heidi (given name)

Feminine given names